Granite Hills is a census-designated place in San Diego County, California. The name is also applied to a neighborhood within the city limits of El Cajon in the eastern part of that city. The population of the CDP, which does not include the people living within the city of El Cajon, was 3,035 at the 2010 census, down from 3,246 at the 2000 census.

Geography
According to the USGS, Granite Hills is located at  
(32.8031070, -116.9047476), which is near intersection of Madison Avenue and Greenfield Drive. The rest of the neighborhood is on unincorporated land. According to the United States Census Bureau, the Granite Hills CDP is located at  (32.804101, -116.910522). Mail sent to all parts of Granite Hills is addressed to El Cajon, California.

Demographics

2010
The 2010 United States Census reported that Granite Hills had a population of 3,035. The racial makeup of Granite Hills was 2,617 (86.2%) White, 43 (1.4%) African American, 26 (0.9%) Native American, 45 (1.5%) Asian, 9 (0.3%) Pacific Islander, 158 (5.2%) from other races, and 137 (4.5%) from two or more races. Hispanic or Latino of any race were 401 persons (13.2%).

The Census reported that 3,023 people (99.6% of the population) lived in households, 12 (0.4%) lived in non-institutionalized group quarters, and 0 (0%) were institutionalized.

There were 1,032 households, out of which 309 (29.9%) had children under the age of 18 living in them, 674 (65.3%) were opposite-sex married couples living together, 90 (8.7%) had a female householder with no husband present, 62 (6.0%) had a male householder with no wife present.  There were 41 (4.0%) unmarried opposite-sex partnerships, and 4 (0.4%) same-sex married couples or partnerships. 150 households (14.5%) were made up of individuals, and 82 (7.9%) had someone living alone who was 65 years of age or older. The average household size was 2.93.  There were 826 families (80.0% of all households); the average family size was 3.19.

The population was spread out, with 538 people (17.7%) under the age of 18, 311 people (10.2%) aged 18 to 24, 578 people (19.0%) aged 25 to 44, 1,042 people (34.3%) aged 45 to 64, and 566 people (18.6%) who were 65 years of age or older.  The median age was 47.0 years. For every 100 females, there were 102.1 males.  For every 100 females age 18 and over, there were 100.9 males.

The homeowner vacancy rate was 1.8%; the rental vacancy rate was 4.0%.  2,688 people (88.6% of the population) lived in owner-occupied housing units and 335 people (11.0%) lived in rental housing units.

2000
As of the census of 2000, there were 3,246 people, 1,043 households, and 895 families residing in the CDP. The population density was 1,118.1 inhabitants per square mile (432.2/km2). The racial makeup of the CDP was 91.59% White, 1.45% African American, 0.68% Native American, 0.99% Asian, 0.12% Pacific Islander, 2.99% from other races, and 2.19% from two or more races. Hispanic or Latino of any race were 7.27% of the population.

There were 1,043 households, out of which 32.5% had children under the age of 18 living with them, 75.0% were married couples living together, 6.8% had a female householder with no husband present, and 14.1% were non-families. 11.1% of all households were made up of individuals, and 4.9% had someone living alone who was 65 years of age or older.  The average household size was 3.07 and the average family size was 3.22.

In the CDP, the population was spread out, with 24.2% under the age of 18, 8.4% from 18 to 24, 23.7% from 25 to 44, 29.1% from 45 to 64, and 14.5% who were 65 years of age or older.  The median age was 42 years. For every 100 females, there were 102.1 males.  For every 100 females age 18 and over, there were 102.7 males.

The median income for a household in the CDP was $73,269, and the median income for a family was $75,359. Males had a median income of $46,463 versus $35,521 for females. The per capita income for the CDP was $29,153.  None of the families and 2.2% of the population were living below the poverty line, including no under eighteens and 2.0% of those over 64.

Annexation attempt
In 2006, El Cajon attempted to annex a small portion of unincorporated land that is part of the Granite Hills CDP (census block 3006) to allow The Home Depot to build a store there. Protests from the residents of the El Cajon neighborhood surrounding the unincorporated land fell on deaf ears and the annexation was approved by the city council, only to be rejected by the San Diego Local Agency Formation Commission.

Government

References

Census-designated places in San Diego County, California
East County (San Diego County)
El Cajon, California
Census-designated places in California